Faustyna Kotłowska (born 24 March 2001) is a Polish Paralympic athlete who competes in discus throw, javelin throw and shot put events in international level events.

Kotłowska sustained a serious leg injury in March 2016 when she was involved in an accident. She wears a prosthetic when participating in sporting events.

References

2001 births
Living people
People from Kościerzyna
Paralympic athletes of Poland
Polish female discus throwers
Polish female javelin throwers
Polish female shot putters
Medalists at the World Para Athletics European Championships
Athletes (track and field) at the 2020 Summer Paralympics
21st-century Polish women